Frederick Samuel Northedge (16 October 1918 – 3 March 1985) was a British Professor of International Relations at the London School of Economics.

Early life
He attended Bemrose Grammar School in Derby.  Northedge then read classics at Merton College, Oxford, before moving on to study international relations at the London School of Economics.

Personal life
The Northedge Essay Competition was established in 1986 to recognize Professor Northedge's contribution to the creation of the journal Millennium.

Selected books 
 The troubled giant; Britain among the great powers, 1916-1939 online
 Foreign Policies of the Powers (London: Faber and Faber, 1968) online
 A hundred years of international relations with M.J. Grieve, (1971) online
 Descent from Power: British Foreign Policy, 1945-1973 (London: Allen & Unwin, 1974) online
 The International Political System (London: Faber, 1976)
 Britain and Soviet Communism: The Impact of Revolution (London: Macmillan Press, 1982) 
 The League of Nations: Its Life and Times, 1920-1946 (New York: Holmes and Meier, 1986)

References 

1918 births
Academics of the London School of Economics
British political scientists
International relations scholars
People educated at Bemrose School
Alumni of the London School of Economics
Alumni of Merton College, Oxford
People from Derby
1985 deaths
20th-century political scientists